"Bug Powder Dust" is a song by English musician Bomb the Bass featuring the vocals of Justin Warfield, released in September 1994 as the first single from Bomb the Bass's Clear album.

History
"Bug Powder Dust" reached number 24 on the UK Singles Chart and was voted Select magazine's single of the year in 1994. It also charted in Australia, peaking at number 34 on the ARIA Singles Chart in February 1995.

Charts

References

External links
 

1994 singles
1994 songs
Bomb the Bass songs
Song recordings produced by Bomb the Bass